Ceracanthia mamella is a species of snout moth. It was described by Harrison Gray Dyar Jr. in 1919, and is known from Costa Rica, Guatemala, and Panama.

References

Moths described in 1919
Phycitinae